The 12761 / 12762 Tirupati–Karimnagar Superfast Express is a Superfast Express train belonging to South Central Railway zone that runs between  and  in India. It is currently being operated with 12761/12762 train numbers on bi-weekly basis.

Service

The 12761/Tirupati–Karimnagar Superfast Express has an average speed of 58 km/hr and covers 713 km in 12h 15m. The 12762/Karimnagar–Tirupati Superfast Express has an average speed of 55 km/hr and covers 713 km in 12h 55m.

Route & Halts 

The important halts of the train are:

Coach composition

The train has standard ICF rakes with a max speed of 110 kmph. The train consists of 21 coaches:

 2 AC II Tier
 2 AC III Tier
 12 Sleeper coaches
 5 General Unreserved
 2 Seating cum Luggage Rake

Traction

Both trains are hauled by a Lallaguda Loco Shed-based WAP-7 or electric locomotive from Tirupati to Karimnagar and vice versa.

Rake sharing

The train shares its rake with 17007/17008 Secunderabad–Darbhanga Express and 12769/12770 Seven Hills Express.

Direction reversal

The train reverses its direction 1 times:

See also 

 Tirupati railway station
 Karimnagar railway station
 Yesvantpur–Puducherry Weekly Express
 Secunderabad–Darbhanga Express
 Seven Hills Express

Notes

References

External links 

 12761/Tirupati–Karimnagar Superfast Express India Rail Info
 12762/Karimnagar–Tirupati Superfast Express India Rail Info

Transport in Tirupati
Express trains in India
Rail transport in Andhra Pradesh
Rail transport in Telangana
Railway services introduced in 2013